Ekebergia capensis is a tree in the family Meliaceae. It is commonly known as the Cape ash. Its range extends from the Eastern Cape of South Africa to Sudan and Ethiopia. It has been introduced onto Ascension Island.

Description 
Tree up to 30 meters tall which can be evergreen or semi-evergreen.  Can be up to 1 meter diameter at breast hight and may be slightly buttressed or fluted at the base branchlets with white lenticels. Leaves imparipinnate, with petiole and rhachis up to 35 cm long. Leaflets opposite or subopposite. Flowers white or pinkish white, sweet-scented. Borne in cymose panicles. Fruits are Drupes.

Habitat 
Seasonally dry tropical biome, often in edge environments of montane, mid-altitude or riparian forest. Can also be found in woodland and wooded grassland. Altitude between 600–2650 m.

Gallery

References

 Pooley, E. (1993). The Complete Field Guide to Trees of Natal, Zululand and Transkei. .

External links

 PlantZAfrica.com
 Fernkloof Nature Reserve
 Images on iSpot

Meliaceae